Omorgus lucidus is a species of hide beetle in the subfamily Omorginae.

References

lucidus
Beetles described in 2010